Nikolai Alekseyevich Manoshin (6 March 1938 – 10 February 2022) was a Russian football player and coach.

International career
Manoshin made his debut for USSR on 17 August 1960 in a friendly against East Germany. He was selected for the 1962 FIFA World Cup squad, but did not play in any games at the tournament.

Personal life and death
He died on 10 February 2022, at the age of 83.

Honours
Torpedo Moscow
 Soviet Top League: 1960
 Soviet Cup: 1960

Individual
 Top 33 players year-end list: 1960, 1961, 1962

References

External links
  Profile

1938 births
2022 deaths
Soviet footballers
Footballers from Moscow
Association football midfielders
Soviet Union international footballers
1962 FIFA World Cup players
Soviet Top League players
FC Torpedo Moscow players
PFC CSKA Moscow players
Russian footballers
FC CSKA Kyiv managers
Russian football managers
Soviet football managers
Soviet expatriate football managers
Expatriate football managers in Somalia